Finn Butcher (born 17 March 1995) is a New Zealand slalom canoeist who has competed at the international level since 2012.

He won a silver medal in extreme slalom at the 2021 World Championships in Bratislava.

World Cup individual podiums

References

External links

Living people
New Zealand male canoeists
1995 births
Medalists at the ICF Canoe Slalom World Championships
Sportspeople from Dunedin
20th-century New Zealand people
21st-century New Zealand people